Kane Bentley (born 16 April 1987) is a professional rugby league footballer who plays as a  for the St Gaudens Bears in the Elite One Championship. He has played for both France and Scotland at international level.

He previously played for Toulouse Olympique Broncos in the Elite One Championship.

Early years
Bentley was born in New Zealand, he has Scottish ancestors, and eligible to play for Scotland due to the grandparent rule.

Born to a New Zealand/Samoan father and New Zealand Maori mother in Auckland, Bentley moved to France at a young age where his father played for La Réole XIII.

Playing career
His senior league started at Marseilles then UTC. In 2007, he gained promotion to the Dragons first team squad alongside his brother Andrew, and then moved to Toulouse. In 2015 he signed with the Boston 13s in the United States, helping them to the 2015 USARL Championship.

Saint-Gaudens Bears
On 3 Jun 2020 it was reported that he had signed for Saint-Gaudens Bears in the Elite One Championship

Representative career
Bentley represented France at junior level for a number of years.

He was named in the France squad for the 2008 Rugby League World Cup, and for the Four Nations tournament. Bentley was also eligible for Scotland but he was snubbed for the European Cup, and instead opted to play for France.

He has since been a regular for the senior side, and was named in the squad for the 2013 Rugby League World Cup.

References

External links

Super League profile
Lezignan profile
2017 RLWC profile

1987 births
Living people
Boston 13s players
Catalans Dragons players
Dewsbury Rams players
France national rugby league team players
French people of New Zealand descent
French people of Samoan descent
Sportspeople of Samoan descent
French people of Scottish descent
Lézignan Sangliers players
New Zealand emigrants to France
New Zealand sportspeople of Samoan descent
New Zealand people of Scottish descent
New Zealand rugby league players
Baroudeurs de Pia XIII players
Rugby league hookers
Rugby league players from Auckland
Saint-Gaudens Bears players
Scotland national rugby league team players
Toulouse Olympique Broncos players
Toulouse Olympique players